Raangi is an 2022 Indian Tamil-language action thriller film directed by M. Saravanan and produced by Allirajah Subaskaran under the banner of Lyca Productions. The film stars Trisha. Bekzod Abdumalikov, and Anaswara Rajan in the lead roles. The film's music composed by C Sathya, while cinematography and editing is handled by K. A. Sakthivel and M Subarak respectively. The film was released theatrically on 30 December 2022.

Plot 
Thaiyal Nayagi is a fearless investigative journalist who works for an online news portal and is committed to promoting equality, democracy, and justice. She finds herself arrested by a special police task force for the murder of Police Inspector Krishnamurthy, but is rescued by a team of FBI and CBI agents. The story starts a few weeks earlier, where Thaiyal encounters Inspector Krishnamurthy during a routine police check and records him making inappropriate comments, which she later posts online. The inspector retaliates by sending goons after her, but Thaiyal stands her ground. Thaiyal's niece, Sushmitha, is supportive of her aunt and aspires to be like her. However, she is unaware that she is being blackmailed by a college boy who threatens to release private videos of her. Thaiyal discovers the situation and confronts the boy, discovering that a fake Facebook account was created in Sushmitha's name to talk to boys. Thaiyal gains access to the fake account and finds that the girl behind it was being messaged by middle-aged men. Thaiyal lures these men to a hotel room under the guise of Sushmitha and beats them up, warning them against continuing this behavior.

Thaiyal discovers one of the men who messaged Sushmitha, Aalim, did not attend their meeting. Aalim is revealed to be a terrorist from Libya and his organization is wanted by the US authorities. Thaiyal discovers this after connecting a photo Aalim sent with a news footage. To find Aalim's location, Thaiyal asks for a photo and receives one of Minister Kumaravel Rajan conducting illegal deals with terrorists. Thaiyal uploads the photo online, leading to the minister's death by Indian authorities. Aalim's superior, Abu Farooq, finds out about the photo and forces Aalim to reveal Sushmitha's location. Thaiyal responds that she is from India, causing Abu to send attackers after Sushmitha, but they are arrested by FBI agents. Abu prepares to execute Aalim but is caught in a military ambush. Aalim saves Abu's life and the latter spares him temporarily. Aalim requests Sushmitha (Thaiyal) to create another ID to text him and later, admits his romantic feelings to her.

One day, Thaiyal is arrested by the hate-filled Krishnamurthy, and texts Aalim about it. Aalim, without Thaiyal's knowledge, sends assassins to kill Krishnamurthy. Thaiyal continues to chat with Aalim and learns about his past as a Libyan terrorist. Thaiyal begins to sympathize with Aalim and sends him pictures of her daily life. Aalim travels to Chennai to meet Sushmitha, but Thaiyal rushes to prevent the meeting and is arrested by the special task force. The FBI forces Thaiyal to convince Aalim to agree to a meeting in Libya. Thaiyal and Sushmitha embark on a journey to Libya with the agents. A local taxi driver relays the news of Sushmitha's arrival in Libya to Aalim, filling him with exhilaration.

Unbeknownst to Aalim, Abu and his associates have devised a plan for revenge and plan to eliminate Sushmitha, Thaiyal, and the accompanying agents. However, Thaiyal fiercely fights back. Aalim arrives and kills Abu's men to protect Sushmitha, who is unaware of his identity. Thaiyal tries to help Aalim escape, but he cannot understand her language. Abu finds Thaiyal, but is shot dead by the FBI agents. The head of the agents orders his men to kill Sushmitha to draw out Aalim, who sacrifices himself to protect her. As Aalim draws his last breaths, he professes his love for Sushmitha and presents her with a talisman she had previously gifted to a taxi driver. Thaiyal is devastated by Aalim's passing and mourns deeply. Afterwards, she and Sushmitha return home to India safely where she writes a book that details the story of Aalim's life.

Cast 
 Trisha as Thaiyal Nayagi 
 Anaswara Rajan as Sushmitha
 Bekzod Abdumalikov as Aalim
Lizzie Antony as Priya, Sushmitha's mother
John Mahendran as Police Inspector Krishnamurthy
Gopi Kannadasan
Waqar Khan

Production
The film was tentatively titled as Trisha61. On 20 April 2019, the title was announced to be Raangi. The shooting of the film was wrapped up on 12 February 2020.

Music 
The music of the film is composed by C. Sathya which marks his third collaboration with M. Saravanan after Engaeyum Eppothum and Ivan Veramathiri. The first single titled "Panithuli" was released on 15 December 2020.

Release

Theatrical 
The film was released theatrically on 30 December 2022 alongside Kovai Sarala’s Sembi. Initially planned for a theatrical release, this was later cancelled in favour of a digital release due to the COVID-19 pandemic although the plans for the digital release was later dropped.

Home media 
The post-theatrical streaming rights of the film has been sold to Sun NXT and Netflix, while the satellite rights of the film is sold to Sun TV. The film is scheduled for its digital premiere on the streaming platform from 29 January 2023.

Reception
The film received mixed reviews from critics.

A critic for India Herald wrote "Unexpectedly fantastic, Raangi is the ideal weekend action thriller". Logesh Balachandran of The Times of India gave the film 3.5 out of 5 stars and wrote "Raangi is unexpectedly great and it's a perfect action thriller for the weekend". Janani K of India Today gave the film 2 out of 5 stars and wrote "Trisha has given a decent performance as Thaiyal Nayagi, but it is baffling to see how she agreed to go by so many problematic ideas". Yuva Nandini of ABP Live 3.5 out of 5 stars and wrote "Overall, Rangi is not only entertaining but also thought provoking". A critic for Cinema Vikatan wrote "C. Satya's music is unimpressive;  The background music is also average". P. Sangeetha of OTT Play gave the film 2.5 out of 5 stars and wrote "Watch it only for Trisha's performance". Stalin Navaneethakrishnan of Hindustan Times wrote "If you want to watch a sensational film, then you can go for watching Raangi". Khalillulah of Hindu Tamil Thisai wrote "Apart from that, the inadequacy of the scenes to do justice to the soul of the story is felt towards the end". Sakshi Post gave the film 3.5 out of 5 stars and wrote "Put this action thriller on your watchlist." Kirubhakar Purushothaman of The Indian Express gave the film 1 out of 5 stars and wrote "It’s unfortunate that after a great comeback as Kundhavai in Ponniyin Selvan this year, Trisha ends 2022 on such a low note". Avinash Ramachandran of Cinema Express rated the film 1.5 out of 5, and wrote, "Constant oscillation between insensitivity and wokeness simply magnifies the problematic parts of the narrative".

References

External links 
 
 Lyca Productions official website page

2022 films
Films postponed due to the COVID-19 pandemic
2020s Tamil-language films
Indian action thriller films